This is a list of Moroccan billionaires based on an annual assessment of wealth and assets compiled and published by Forbes.

Moroccan Billionaires List

References

Lists of people by wealth
Net worth
 
Billionaires